The Fifth Witness is the 23rd novel by American author Michael Connelly and features the fourth starring appearance of Los Angeles criminal defense attorney Michael "Mickey" Haller.  The Fifth Witness was published in the United States on April 5, 2011.

Plot
Haller is called on to defend a long-standing client, Lisa Trammel, when she is suspected of murdering wealthy Mitchell Bondurant.  According to forensic evidence, the victim, who was six-foot-two, had been murdered with a hammer blow from behind, on the very top of his head, while standing up.

Haller and his staff (including his ex-wife, Lorna Taylor, and his investigator and Lorna's husband, Dennis "Cisco" Wojciechowski) work on demolishing the prosecution case, led by Andrea Freeman, against whom Haller has never won.  On discovering the probable involvement of the murder victim with organized crime, Haller concentrates on establishing alternative suspects as well as relying on the forensic evidence which suggests that Trammel is physically incapable of the crime.

Haller's case hinges on the testimony of a witness whom he manoeuvres into taking the Fifth Amendment on the witness stand, thus creating a plausible alternate killer for the jury (making him both the fifth witness in sequence and the "Fifth" witness).  Before Haller can detail Opparizio's crime connections in open court, the witness takes the Fifth, ending his testimony.  The judge instructs the jury to disregard the entire testimony, but the jury still acquits Trammel.

In a final twist that introduces "a moral dimension" into the case, Haller realizes that Trammel is guilty.  He confronts her, and is shaken by her indifferent response.  Three weeks later, Haller's law practice is booming as a result of the trial, when he gets a call from Trammel, in which she both accuses him of tipping off the police to dig up her garden and begs him to represent her when she is tried for her husband's murder.  He refuses, telling her that he has just filed to run for Los Angeles County district attorney because he no longer wishes to associate with people like her.

References

External links 
 Official Michael Connelly Website

Novels by Michael Connelly
Novels set in Los Angeles
2011 American novels
Little, Brown and Company books